The academic and administrative buildings and the residence halls located on the campus of the University of Maryland, College Park. The campus is located in College Park, Maryland.

Academic and administrative buildings

Residence Halls (Dormitories)

References

 01
B01
Maryland, College Park Campus
University
Buildings and structures in Prince George's County, Maryland